The 2012 season was the 34th season in Kuala Lumpur's existence, and their third consecutive year in the top flight of Malaysian football. Kuala Lumpur were subsequently relegated to the 2013 Malaysia Premier League.

After losing more than half of their squad from the previous season owing to financial difficulties, Kuala Lumpur begin the 2012 season as relegation battlers. Due to the poor condition of the KLFA Stadium pitch, KL have elected to play their home games at the Hang Jebat Stadium in Malacca.

Season review

Pre-season
Kuala Lumpur began their pre-season schedule by handing trials to a host of players to replace more than half of the squad decimated by player departures. KL failed to score in their first four friendly games which ended in defeats to Police (0-3), touring team Joga Limpo of Brazil (0-3), Johor FC (0-1) and Armed Forces (0-2).

Following the close of the pre-season transfer window on December 8, 2011, KL were left with an all-local line up after a FA employee bungled the transfer of Nigerian defender Raimi Ayo Hassan. Results in friendly matches did not improve as KL were beaten by Johor (0-1) and Terengganu (1-2) though KL finally scored through Afiq Azmi. KL ended a run of six defeats by holding Pos Malaysia 1-1 before defeats against Kelantan (0-2) and Sime Darby (0-1) followed. KL wrapped up their pre-season fixtures with a 1–1 draw against FAM League side Malacca.

January
KL did not have the best of starts, falling to a 2–0 defeat away to Sarawak in the opening Super League match in Kuching. Seven players made their KL debut, including three who were playing in the top-flight for the first time, an indication of the raw material coach Razip Ismail has to work with. After going down two more defeats to Kuala Terengganu T-Team (0-3) and Singapore LionsXII (1-2), KL finally claimed their first point of the season with a 1–1 home draw against PKNS and ended the month with a 3–0 defeat to Super League champions Kelantan to remain firmly rooted at the bottom of the standings.

In a bid to boost the team's struggle against relegation, KL agreed to a loan deal with Kelantan to bring in foreign players Zakaria Charara and Emmanuel Okine until the end of the season while releasing Raimi Ayo Hassan from his contract.

February

Charara and Okine made their KL debut on February 8 against Kedah but could not prevent the team from going down 1–0. Things got worst as Okine was sent off in the next match against Johor FC in a 2–0 defeat before another 2–0 loss at Sabah followed. KL finally claimed their first competitive win of the season, and their first clean-sheet, with a 3-0 success over Muar Municipal Council in the FA Cup.

March

KL's woes in the league continued when they suffered an eighth defeat, a 1–0 loss to Terengganu. KL then exited the FA Cup in the second round after a 3–2 defeat away to Kelantan before losing to Klang Valley rivals Selangor 3–0 in the league. KL ended a seven-match run in the league with a goal from Afiq Azmi, who earned a call-up to the national team for the first time this month, but it was not enough to prevent a 2–1 defeat to Negeri Sembilan.

April

April began in the same fashion as March ended with KL losing 2–1 at Perak as Emmanuel Okine scored his first goal for the team. KL then suffered their heaviest defeat of the season in a 4-0 city derby loss to Felda United, ending the first round of the league with just one point from 13 games, and setting an unwanted club-record of nine straight league defeats, eclipsing the previous worst of eight-in-a-row set in 1980. The second round began on the same note as KL fell 1–0 to Felda United in the return fixture.

May

KL began May on a positive note, holding Sarawak to a 1–1 draw for its second point in the league and halting a club-record of 10 consecutive league defeats. But another setback followed when KL went down 2–1 at Kuala Terengganu T-Team in their following match. KL achieved its first clean-sheet in the league in holding Singapore LionsXII to a 0–0 draw at home.

June

KL returned to action after a three-week break resuming where they left off by holding PKNS 1–1 in Petaling Jaya, KL's first away point in the league. KL's next game was a scheduled home match against Kelantan but chose to play it away to cash in on the gate collection and promptly lost 1–0. The next defeat, 2–1 to Kedah, meant KL could no longer qualify for the Malaysia Cup. A 1–0 defeat to Johor FC in the subsequent game confirmed relegation from the Super League with five matches to spare before ending June with a 4-2 reverse against Sabah.

July

Entering the final month of competition, KL's quest for a first league win continues after a 2–1 defeat at Terengganu. Selangor dealt KL a 4–0 defeat in the Klang Valley derby before KL claimed just their fifth point in a 1–1 draw at Negeri Sembilan. KL ended the season with a 5–2 loss against Perak and without a league victory for the first time since 1980.

August

As KL did not qualify for the Malaysia Cup, five players accepted loan offers from teams that did. They are Afiq Azmi (Kelantan), Aslam Najumudeen (Kelantan), Ahmad Dashila Tajudin (Sime Darby), Pritam Singh (Felda United) and Badrul Hisyam Azmi (PKNS). Loan recruits Emmanuel Okine, Zakaria Charara, Azrul Azmi and Khairul Anuar Jamil returned to their respective parent teams.

League table

Super League

Transfers

Transfers in
First Team

Source: Kuala Lumpur FA Facebook

President's Cup Under-21

Source: Kuala Lumpur FA Facebook

Loans in
First Team

Source: Kuala Lumpur FA Facebook

Transfers out
First team

Source: Kuala Lumpur FA Facebook

Out on loan
First team

Source: Kuala Lumpur FA Facebook

Players

First team

<small>*Appearances are from 2009 onwards; Goals are throughout a player's career with KL</small>

Matches

Friendly matches

Source: Kuala Lumpur FA Facebook

Super League

FA Cup

Squad statistics

Appearances and goals

Top scorers
Includes all competitive matches. The list is sorted by shirt number when total goals are equal.Last updated on 17 July 2012 ''

References

External links
Unofficial KLFA Facebook page

Kuala Lumpur
2012